Abhaya Simha is a Kannada film director and screenwriter. He was born and brought up in Mangalore, Karnataka, INDIA. He did his graduation from St. Aloysius College, Mangalore. He studied Kannada, English Literature and Journalism. After that he specialized in Film Direction from Film and Television Institute of India, Pune. He started his film career in Bangalore in 2007. His debut venture Gubbachchigalu won the National Award for the best children's film for the year 2008. His second venture was a bilingual movie named Shikari. Shikari was released in March 2012 across Karnataka and Kerala. His third film was Sakkare in Kannada starring Ganesh (actor). It was released across Karnataka in November 2013. In 2017 he made Paddayi in Tulu won 65th National award for Best Feature Film in Tulu.

Early life
Abhaya Simha has completed his graduation from St Aloysius College, Mangalore. Later he did his film studies from Film and Television Institute of India (FTII) Pune. His grandfather was G.T. Narayana Rao, a well-known science writer in Kannada, music critic, cultural organiser, and a prominent citizen of the city of Mysore, India.

Filmography

References

External links

Living people
1981 births
Artists from Mangalore
21st-century Indian film directors
Kannada film directors
Malayalam film directors
Film directors from Karnataka
Screenwriters from Karnataka
Directors who won the Best Children's Film National Film Award